John Barber may refer to:

Politics
John Barber (Lord Mayor of London) (died 1741), Jacobite printer, Lord Mayor of London in 1732
John Barber, represented Tryon County in the North Carolina General Assembly of 1777
John Roaf Barber (1841–1917), Canadian industrialist and politician

Sports
Jack Barber (1901–1961), English footballer
John Barber (basketball) (born 1927), retired American basketball player
John Barber (cricketer) (1849–1908), English cricketer
John Barber (racing driver) (1929–2015), retired British Formula One driver
Skip Barber (born 1936 as John Barber III), retired American racecar driver

Others
John Barber (artist, scholar), Vancouver-based sound artist and scholar
John Barber (businessman), (died 2004) British businessman
John Barber (clergyman) (died 1549), English clergyman
John Barber (engineer) (1734–1801), English inventor of the gas turbine in 1791
John P. Barber, American engineer, pioneer of the railgun technology
John T. Barber, Cornish bard and poet hailing from St. Ives
John Warner Barber (1798–1885), American artist and author of popular histories
John William Barber ("Bill" Barber, 1920–2007), American tuba player

See also
John Barber White (1847–1923), American businessman and politician